Erichthonius (Ancient Greek: Ἐριχθόνιος) of Dardania was a mythical king of Dardanus in Greek mythology. He was the son of Dardanus and Batea (in some other legends his mother is said to be, Olizone, daughter of Phineus). He was the brother of Ilus and Zacynthus. Erichthonius was said to have enjoyed a peaceful and prosperous reign.

Etymology 
Erichthonius is of uncertain etymology, possibly related to a pre-Greek form *Erektyeu-. The connection of Ἐριχθόνιος with ἐρέχθω, "shake" is a late folk-etymology; other folk-etymologies include ἔριον, erion, "wool" or eris, "strife"+ χθών chthôn or chthonos, "earth".

Mythology 
Fundamentally, all that is known of this Erichthonius comes from Homer, who says (Samuel Butler's translation of Iliad 20.215-234): 

 In the beginning Dardanos was the son of Zeus, and founded Dardania, for Ilion was not yet established on the plain for men to dwell in, and her people still abode on the spurs of many-fountained Ida. Dardanos had a son, king Erichthonios, who was wealthiest of all men living; he had three thousand mares that fed by the water-meadows, they and their foals with them. Boreas was enamored of them as they were feeding, and covered them in the semblance of a dark-maned stallion. Twelve filly foals did they conceive and bear him, and these, as they sped over the fertile plain, would go bounding on over the ripe ears of wheat and not break them; or again when they would disport themselves on the broad back of Ocean they could gallop on the crest of a breaker. Erichthonios begat Tros, king of the Trojans, and Tros had three noble sons, Ilos, Assarakos, and Ganymede who was comeliest of mortal men; wherefore the gods carried him off to be Zeus' cupbearer, for his beauty's sake, that he might dwell among the immortals.

John Tzetzes and one of the scholia to Lycophron call his wife Astyoche, the naiad daughter of the river-god Simoeis. The Bibliotheca also adds Erichthonius' older brother Ilus, who died young and childless; presumably a doublet of the other Ilus, grandson of Erichthonius, eponym of Troy.  In one account, Erichthonius was said to be the father of Ganymede.

Strabo records, but discounts, the claim by "some more recent writers" that Teucer came from the deme of Xypeteones in Attica, supposedly called Troes (meaning  Trojans) in mythical times. These writers mentioned that Erichthonius appears as founder both in Attica and the Troad, and may be identifying the two.

Erichthonius reigned for forty six or, according to others, sixty five years and was succeeded by his son Tros.

Family tree

Notes

References 
 Apollodorus, The Library with an English Translation by Sir James George Frazer, F.B.A., F.R.S. in 2 Volumes, Cambridge, MA, Harvard University Press; London, William Heinemann Ltd. 1921. ISBN 0-674-99135-4. Online version at the Perseus Digital Library. Greek text available from the same website.
Beekes, S. P., Etymological Dictionary of Greek, 2 vols. Leiden: Brill, 2009.
Dictys Cretensis, from The Trojan War. The Chronicles of Dictys of Crete and Dares the Phrygian translated by Richard McIlwaine Frazer, Jr. (1931-). Indiana University Press. 1966. Online version at the Topos Text Project.
Dionysus of Halicarnassus, Roman Antiquities. English translation by Earnest Cary in the Loeb Classical Library, 7 volumes. Harvard University Press, 1937-1950. Online version at Bill Thayer's Web Site
Dionysius of Halicarnassus, Antiquitatum Romanarum quae supersunt, Vol I-IV. . Karl Jacoby. In Aedibus B.G. Teubneri. Leipzig. 1885. Greek text available at the Perseus Digital Library.
 Gaius Julius Hyginus, Fabulae from The Myths of Hyginus translated and edited by Mary Grant. University of Kansas Publications in Humanistic Studies. Online version at the Topos Text Project.
 Graves, Robert; The Greek Myths, Moyer Bell Ltd; Unabridged edition (December 1988), .
Greek Mythology Link 2003-10-01
March, J., Cassell's Dictionary Of Classical Mythology, London, 1999. 
Notes to the Bibliotheca 3.12.2; ed. by. Sir James George Frazer.
Perseus Encyclopedia, Erichthonius.
Strabo, The Geography of Strabo. Edition by H.L. Jones. Cambridge, Mass.: Harvard University Press; London: William Heinemann, Ltd. 1924. Online version at the Perseus Digital Library.
Strabo, Geographica edited by A. Meineke. Leipzig: Teubner. 1877. Greek text available at the Perseus Digital Library.

Princes in Greek mythology
Mythological kings of Troy
Kings in Greek mythology
Trojans